Nai, also known as Sain/Sen, is a generic term for occupational castes of barbers. The name is said to be derived from the Sanskrit word nāpita (नापित).  In modern times Nai in northern India refer to themselves as "Sain" instead of Nai.

The Nai caste was listed as an Other Backward Classes in various regions of India. These include Andhra Pradesh, Assam, Bihar, Chandigarh, Chhattisgarh, Dadra and Nagar Haveli, Daman and Diu, Delhi NCR, Goa, Gujarat, Haryana, Himachal Pradesh, Goa, Jharkhand, Karnataka, Madhya Pradesh, Maharashtra, Odisha, Puducherry, Punjab, Rajasthan, Tripura, Uttaranchal, Uttar Pradesh, West Bengal.

History 
The traditional occupation of Nais is barbering. The barber also has duties in connection with marriages and other festive occasions. They act as the Brahmin’s assistant, and perform marriages for the lower castes, who cannot employ a Brahmin.

Origin

Puranic view
According to a legend prevalent among Nai they are descended from Nabhi, who in puranic literature is king of the Ikshvaku dynasty.

Other views 
They are refereed as Ampitta in Puranas. 'Ampitta' is derived from the Sanskrit word "Ambashtha", which means Physician. In Tamil region some members of the barber caste practiced medicine and used to be called Ambathan.

Impact of the Ideas of Sain 
The process of the Nais adopting the ideas and teachings of Bhagat Sain can be conceptualized as Sainization, depicted through deifying Sain by setting up the institution of Sainacharya. Sain, who was the contemporaries of Kabir, the Bhakti poet who challenged the hegemonic values and hierarchy of the caste system, has become the most revered symbol of pride and identity formation of the Nais. In order to assert their cultural autonomy in 1992 Akhil Bharatiya Sain Bhaktipith Trust was set up on the occasion of the Ujjain mahakumbh mela headed in Pushkar. Achlanandji Maharaj was made the first Sainacharya.

Notable people 

Bhagat Sain, Saint and Bhakti Poet
Sahib Singh, one of the Panj Pyare
Bhikhari Thakur, Bhojpuri Poet
Karpoori Thakur, Former C.M of Bihar

References
https://joshuaproject.net/people_groups/17745/IN
Indian castes
Sikh communities
Social groups of Uttar Pradesh
Social groups of Madhya Pradesh
Social groups of Haryana
Social groups of West Bengal
Social groups of Assam
Social groups of Andhra Pradesh
Social groups of Karnataka
Social groups of Tamil Nadu
Social groups of Rajasthan
Social groups of Odisha
Social groups of Bihar
Social groups of Gujarat
Social groups of Maharashtra
Barber castes